Miklós Tótfalusi Kis (1650 - March 20, 1702) was a Hungarian letter cutter, typeface designer, typographer and printer. Kis was one of the first printers and letter cutters of the Georgian type letters. He made fonts on the request of the Georgian king Archil of Imereti.

References

Perrousseaux, Yves (2006) Histoire de l’écriture typographique, de Gutenberg au xviie siècle, Atelier Perrousseaux
Sharadze, Guram (1982) Miklos Kis Totfalusi and the Georgian printing, Tbilisi
Dán, Róbert (1980) Tótfalusi Kis Miklós grúz betűi, Magyar Könyvszemle

1650 births
1702 deaths
Hungarian publishers (people)
Hungarian typographers and type designers
Artists from Cluj-Napoca